"The Boogeyman" is a short story by Stephen King, first published in the March 1973 issue of the magazine Cavalier, and later collected in King's 1978 collection Night Shift.

Plot summary
The story takes place in the office of Dr. Harper, a psychiatrist, where a man named Lester Billings talks to the doctor about the "murders" of his three young children, describing the events of the past several years. His first two children died mysteriously of apparently unrelated causes (diagnosed as crib death and convulsions, respectively) when left alone in their bedrooms. The only commonalities were that the children cried "Boogeyman!" before being left alone, and the closet door ajar after discovering their corpses, even though Billings is certain the door was shut.

Approximately a year after their second child's death, Billings' wife Rita became pregnant with their son Andy and subsequently moved to a different neighborhood far from the old one. A year passes without incident with Andy sleeping in the master bedroom with Billings and Rita. Billings believes that the monster eventually tracked his family down, intruding the house and slithering around at night. Not long after, Rita leaves to take care of her ill mother, leaving Billings and Andy alone.

Feeling the malevolent presence growing bolder in his wife's absence, Billings began to panic, and decided to move Andy to a separate bedroom, knowing that the monster would go for him. That night, Andy cried "Boogeyman!" while being put to bed and, an hour later, was attacked and killed by the Boogeyman. Billings, upon seeing the creature throttling Andy, fled to a local 24-hour diner. He later returned home at dawn, called the police, and discovered Andy's corpse on the floor with the closet door ajar. Billings convinced the police that Andy had attempted to climb out of his crib during the night and broken his neck.

As Billings finishes his story and starts to leave, Dr. Harper recommends making future appointments with the nurse. Finding the nurse absent, Billings returns to Harper's office and finds it empty, with the closet door ajar. The Boogeyman emerges from the closet, casting off its disguise of Dr. Harper.

Adaptations
It was adapted into a movie by Jeff C. Schiro in 1982. It has also been performed at the Edinburgh Festival Fringe as a full length theatrical play, directed by television actor David Oakes. In 2010, Irish film-maker Gerard Lough adapted it into a 27-minute movie.

In 2018, writers Scott Beck and Bryan Woods announced that they would be adapting the story. In September 2019, Beck and Woods revealed that they were still working on the project at 20th Century Fox despite its purchase by Disney.

In May 2020, when asked if the adaptation was still happening, Beck and Woods said that they were unsure at the moment if the project was still going to move forward.

An adaptation of the same name is scheduled to be released on June 2, 2023, by 20th Century Studios. Written by Mark Heyman and directed by Rob Savage, it stars Sophie Thatcher, Chris Messina, David Dastmalchian, Marin Ireland, Vivien Lyra Blair, and Madison Hu.

See also
 Stephen King short fiction bibliography

References

External links
 (1982)
 (2010)
Stephen King Short Movies
The Giuliano Dinocca's boogeyman at Creepshows
Dinocca production's The boogeyman page
Stephen King Short movies - The Boogeyman (2nd version)
The Boogeyman (Play) (2005) by Graham Rees (60 minutes)
Stephen King Short movies - The Boogeyman (3 version)

1978 short stories
Horror short stories
Short stories by Stephen King
Short stories adapted into films
Works originally published in Cavalier (magazine)